Luyi Subdistrict is a subdistrict situated on northwestern part of Tongzhou District, Beijing. It shares border with Yongshun Town in the northwest, Songzhuang Town in the northeast, Lucheng Town in the east, Xinhua and Tongyun Subdistrict in the south. 

The subdistrict was created in 2020.

Administrative divisions 

As of 2021, the subdistrict oversaw 9 residential communities:

See also 
 List of township-level divisions of Beijing

References 

Tongzhou District, Beijing
Subdistricts of Beijing